Tamar (Tako) Charkviani (b. 22 September 1962) is a Georgian political figure.

Since 2020 she is member of Parliament of Georgia by party list, bloc: "Giorgi Vashadze – Strategy Aghmashenebeli".  She is chairperson of Law and Justice. 

Her father was Georgian poet Jansug Charkviani.

References

External links
 Her biography on site of Parliament of Georgia

1962 births
Living people
Members of the Parliament of Georgia
21st-century politicians from Georgia (country)